The IEC 61970 series of standards by the International Electrotechnical Commission (IEC) deals with the application program interfaces for energy management systems (EMS). The series provides a set of guidelines and standards to facilitate:
 The integration of applications developed by different suppliers in the control center environment;
 The exchange of information to systems external to the control center environment, including transmission, distribution and generation systems external to the control center that need to exchange real-time data with the control center;
 The provision of suitable interfaces for data exchange across legacy and new systems.

Set of standards
The complete set of standards includes the following parts:
 Part 1: Guidelines and general requirements
 Part 2: Glossary
 Part 3XX: Common Information Model (CIM)
 Part 4XX: Component Interface Specification (CIS)
 Part 5XX: CIS Technology Mappings

See also
 IEC 61968
 MultiSpeak
 Common Information Model (electricity)
 IEC 61850
 CIM Profile

External links 
 
 CIM Users Group
61970